Passionate Song (Italian: Canzone appassionata) is a 1953 Italian musical melodrama film directed by Giorgio Simonelli and starring Nilla Pizzi, Gérard Landry and Vira Silenti.

Plot 
Lucia Spinelli, orphaned by both parents, is taken as a housekeeper in the house of Mrs. Carla Parodi, when she reaches the age of majority, the young woman is almost forced to marry Mrs. Carla's brother. After the marriage and the birth of the first child, Parodi's intrusions on the life of the two spouses continue. At the age of five, the little girl is sent to a college at Carla's suggestion, leaving Lucia in solitude, filled by the presence of Alberto, a shady individual who, after becoming her lover, pushes her to work as a singer in a nightclub. After leaving her husband, Lucia continues her work in the show that will take her around the world, but when she returns, after a few years, she will see her daughter again and will have the sad news about Alberto's attempts to take advantage of the young woman, in the dramatic final Lucia will kill Alberto.

Cast
 Nilla Pizzi as Lucia Spinelli  
 Gérard Landry as Albert Dupont  
 Vira Silenti as Fiorella  
 Cesare Fantoni as Lorenzo Parodi  
 Elisa Cegani as Carla Parodi  
 Umberto Spadaro as Il Commissario  
 Carlo Tusco as Franco  
 Paola Quattrini as Fiorella di Piccola  
 France Degand as Blondie  
 Gaetano Verna as Avv. del Divorzio 
 Luisa Rivelli as Amante de Alberto  
 Nino Cavalieri as Bernardini  
 Zoe Incrocci as Prostituta alla Stazione  
 Mario Passante as L'Impresario Vitale  
 Giusi Raspani Dandolo as La Turista  
 Guido Barbarisi as Lo Snob  
 Bruno Cantalamessa as L'Algerino 
 Umberto Aquilino as Compratore dei Gioielli 
 Gigi Reder as Un Turista

References

Bibliography
 Parish, James Robert . Film Actors Guide. Scarecrow Press, 1977.

External links
 

1953 films
1950s Italian-language films
Films directed by Giorgio Simonelli
1950s musical drama films
Italian musical drama films
1953 drama films
Italian black-and-white films
Melodrama films
1950s Italian films